Student Canteen is a Philippine television variety show regarded as the first afternoon variety show on Philippine television. Over a 32-year period, it was broadcast through three different networks: ABS-CBN (1958 to 1965), GMA Network (1975 to 1986) and Radio Philippines Network (1989 to 1990).

History

DZXL
Student Canteen was originally a radio show on DZXL hosted by Eddie Ilarde, Bobby Ledesma, Bobby de Veyra and Leila Benitez entitled CBN Canteen. The noontime show was aired on the canteen of the old Manila Chronicle Building in Aduana, Manila. It was later renamed Student Canteen after it became a hit with students.

Chronicle Broadcasting Network (1958–1965)
In July 1958, DZXL Channel 9, then owned by the Chronicle Broadcasting Network (a precursor of ABS-CBN) started broadcast operations. Student Canteen was brought to television that same year.

The noontime show ended in 1965 when Eddie Ilarde went into politics. Prior to that however, the set of hosts for the show were replaced after main hosts Bobby Ledesma and Leila Benitez walked out of the program along with Eddie following a dispute. Pete Roa, then production manager of ABS-CBN, handpicked his wife Boots Anson-Roa, Ben Aniceto, Pepe Pimentel and Nelda Navarro as replacements.

Noontime show successors
Magandang Tanghali, a musical variety show hosted by Pancho Magalona, and Stop Look and Listen, a former noontime variety show hosted by Eddie Mesa, took over the Student Canteen timeslot in 1965. After Mesa left for the United States, Twelve O'Clock High, a show hosted by Ariel Ureta and Tina Revilla, premiered and aired until 1972 when martial law was declared. The show moved to RBS (now GMA Network) as Ariel con Tina, through a blocktimer company headed by Romy Jalosjos from 1972 to 1974. Lunch Break also gained ground on the same channel before Student Canteen was eventually revived.

GMA Network (1975–1986)
In 1975, the triumvirate of Menardo Jimenez, Felipe Gozon and Gilberto Duavit Sr. took over Republic Broadcasting System (RBS) and changed its name to GMA Radio-Television Arts.  Looking for a show that can serve as a gateway to daytime dominance, the new management conducted negotiations with Eddie Ilarde who readily agreed to revive Student Canteen under his production company Program Philippines Inc.

In January 1975, Student Canteen was revived, with Helen Vela and Coney Reyes joining original hosts Pepe Pimentel, Bobby Ledesma and Eddie Ilarde. Ramon Ramano was the original director of the show.  Ariston "Aris" Bautista was the floor director, and later the show's director.

The show had a segment called "Search for the Student Canteener" which was a singing contest. This segment attracted a lot of high quality contestants and many of former "Canteeners", including Marco Sison, became successful professional singers. Many other singing contest segments within the show produced some of the country's top singers. Bert Nievera, for example, was the champion of the segment called, "Search for Johnny Mathis of the Philippines."

The program also featured a highly popular segment called "IQ 7" which was actually a quiz contest and which produced the country's top quiz champions like Bong Barrameda, Ramon Lorenzo, Romeo Miat, Victor Saymo, Vic Volfango, Antonio Manaloto, Esmeraldo Tellerva, Gil Manimbo, Eduardo Alvaran, Virgilio Acasio, Nazzir Abbas, Roberto Villareal, Emilio Apostol, Nehemias Miguel, Nilo Francisco, Sonny Pascual, Leoncio Pelayo, David Oriel, Leon Bongulto, Pete Dadula, Boni Magtibay, and many others who have gone on to excel in their respective chosen fields of endeavor. A spin-off of the quiz segment "IQ 7" called "Battle of Campus Brains" produced the first and only female quiz champion in the history of GMA-7 quiz shows, Essem Zisenia Solomon, who defeated the then reigning champion Pete Dadula and several other quiz veterans.

Student Canteen was the only noontime show that existed in the 1970s before the debut of Eat Bulaga! on July 30, 1979, hosted by the trio of Tito, Vic & Joey, formerly from Student Canteen. Eat Bulaga! was in danger of cancellation until the segment "Mr. Macho" made it the top-rating noontime show in 1980. Afterwards, Student Canteen'''s ratings began to decline. Coney Reyes would leave the show after it took in Chiqui Hollman, formerly from Eat Bulaga!. Other fresh faces would later join Student Canteen, including Jackie Lou Blanco, Chat Silayan, Dyords Javier and Francis Magalona. Julie Vega was supposed to be included in the show however, the plan was shelved following her illness and subsequent death in 1985.

The show's stint on GMA ended on June 7, 1986 following the People Power Revolution. It was later replaced by Lunch Date.

Radio Philippines Network (1989–1990)Student Canteen went back on air on February 20, 1989 with a new home, RPN (renamed as New Vision 9) replacing "Eat Bulaga!" which moved to ABS-CBN. The show was also retitled Student Canteen (The Third Generation)'' because it was the show's third revival and third decade on Philippine Television. Original hosts Eddie Ilarde and Bobby Ledesma were joined by Malu Maglutac, Jean Garcia, Cherry Pie Picache and Atoy Co as co-hosts. Ramon Lorenzo served as the Quiz Master for the "IQ 7" segment.  It was also during the RPN-9 era when the show was beamed for the first time nationwide via satellite, as the network's DOMSAT facilities were still active despite the sequestration.

The show ended in 1990 due to disagreements between the RPN management and the hosts. A revival was in the works again the following year, but it was shelved after main host Bobby Ledesma died in 1993.

Cast
 Eddie Ilarde 
 Pepe Pimentel 
 Bobby Ledesma 
 The Tiongco Brothers
 Sharon L.
 Helen Vela 
 Leila Benitez 
 Coney Reyes 
 Carmi Martin 
 Tito Sotto 
 Vic Sotto 
 Joey de Leon 
 Malu Maglutac 
 Atoy Co 
 Chiqui Hollman-Yulo 
 Jackie Lou Blanco 
 Dyords Javier
 APO Hiking Society
 Jean Garcia 
 Francis Magalona 
 Rachel Anne Wolfe 
 Chat Silayan 
 JC Bonnin 
 Marco Sison 
 Benedict Aquino
 Jam Morales 
 Charles Harner 
 Lou Veloso
 Cherry Pie Picache

References

External links
 

1958 Philippine television series debuts
1990 Philippine television series endings
1950s Philippine television series
1960s Philippine television series
1970s Philippine television series
1980s Philippine television series
1990s Philippine television series
ABS-CBN original programming
Filipino-language television shows
GMA Network original programming
Philippine variety television shows
Radio Philippines Network original programming